Mount Ralph is a mountain between Mount Gilmour and Mount McCormick in the Ford Ranges, Marie Byrd Land. Discovered and mapped by the United States Antarctic Service (USAS) (1939–41). Named by the Advisory Committee on Antarctic Names (US-ACAN) for Ralph W. Smith, airplane pilot with the Byrd Antarctic Expedition (1933–35).

Mountains of Marie Byrd Land